Rasol may refer to:heli

Gastronomy
Rasol (Romanian dish)
Rasol (cabbage brine), a secondary product obtained by fermentation while making sour cabbage

Places
Rasol (Parvati Valley), a village in Parvati Valley, India 
Rasol, Odisha, a village in Odisha, India